Arthur Leslie Lockwood (1 April 1903 – 8 November 1933) was an English cricketer. Lockwood was a right-handed batsman who bowled right-arm fast-medium. He was born in Romiley, Cheshire.

Lockwood made his only first-class appearance for Wales against Ireland in 1926. In this match, he conceded 50 runs from the 7 overs he bowled in the Irish first-innings, going wicket-less. In their second-innings, he claimed the wicket of Louis Bookman for the cost of 34 runs from 13 overs. With the bat, he was dismissed for 5 in Wales only innings by Gustavus Kelly. Lockwood later made his debut for Denbighshire in the 1930 Minor Counties Championship against Cheshire. He made a further five Minor Counties Championship appearances for the county, the last of which came against Lincolnshire in 1933.

He died in Llandudno, Caernarvonshire on 8 November 1933, aged 30.

References

External links
Arthur Lockwood at ESPNcricinfo
Arthur Lockwood at CricketArchive

1903 births
1933 deaths
People from Romiley
English cricketers
Wales cricketers
Denbighshire cricketers